Bas-Limbé is a commune in the Limbé Arrondissement, in the Nord department of Haiti. It has 50 ,456 inhabitants.

References

Populated places in Nord (Haitian department)
Communes of Haiti